The California Progressive Party, also named California Bull Moose, was a political party that flourished from 1912 to 1944 and lasted through the 1960s.

In 1910, Hiram W. Johnson, a nominal Republican who was backed by suffragette and early feminist Katherine Philips Edson and other progressives opposed to monopoly capitalism epitomized by the Southern and Pacific Railroad, was a successful candidate for California governor running with the support of the Lincoln–Roosevelt League. Johnson served as Theodore Roosevelt's running mate as the vice presidential nominee of the national Progressive "Bull Moose" Party in the 1912 Presidential election. The ticket came in second place and received 88 electoral votes, defeating incumbent President William Howard Taft but losing to Democratic candidate Woodrow Wilson.

Johnson was reelected as Governor of California on the Progressive ticket in 1914, a party he co-founded in 1912.  In 1916, he was elected as a Progressive to the U.S. Senate and continued his affiliation with the state party throughout his decades in the Senate, while simultaneously winning the Republican nomination.  While Johnson was personally close to Theodore Roosevelt, he was much closer ideologically to U.S. Senator  Robert "Fighting Bob" La Follette of Wisconsin.  Johnson sat out the general election in 1924 after unsuccessfully challenging incumbent Calvin Coolidge for the Republican presidential nomination, which was also contested by Fighting Bob La Follette. Johnson personally disliked La Follette but grudgingly admired his quixotic third-party bid and generally agreed with his 1924 platform.

In 1934, when the La Follettes founded the Wisconsin Progressive Party, the California Progressive Party obtained a ballot line in California and ran seven candidates (all unsuccessful, although Raymond L. Haight got 13% of the vote for Governor of California, running as a moderate against socialist and Democratic nominee Upton Sinclair). In 1936 they elected  Franck R. Havenner as Congressman for California's 4th congressional district, and garnered a significant portion of the votes in some other races.

Havenner became a Democrat before the 1938 race; Haight defeated eventual winner Culbert Olson in the Progressive primary election, but received only 2.43% of the vote in the general election as a Progressive; and by the time of the 1942 gubernatorial election, the Progressives were no longer on the California ballot. By 1944, Haight was again a Republican, a delegate to the Republican National Convention. The party nominated the national Progressive Party tickets for president of Henry Wallace and Vincent Hallinan in 1948 and 1952 respectively. The party lasted at the local level and continued to be active through the 50s and 60s but slowly dissolved.

References

California
Political history of California
Political parties disestablished in 1942
Political parties established in 1912
Political parties in California
1912 establishments in California